Rhysopus klynstrai is a species of beetle in the family Carabidae, the only species in the genus Rhysopus.

References

Harpalinae
Beetles described in 1929
Monotypic Carabidae genera